"Black Diamond" is a song by American hard rock band Kiss, written by rhythm guitarist Paul Stanley. "'Black Diamond' was written almost exactly as it is," he said, "except that the riff wasn't there; Gene [Simmons] brought that part in… It's all about arrangement and embellishment. That's what you're supposed to do in a band: come in and add something. But that doesn't mean you wrote the song."

The song is the closing track on the band's eponymous first album, Kiss, released in 1974. It begins with an acoustic opening sung by Stanley before a furious riff enters, accompanied by Peter Criss on lead vocals. It ends with Ace Frehley's solo, then one chord repeated during a gradual slowing of the tape. The live version is usually sped up in tempo, combined with stage pyrotechnics and a rising drum platform.

Appearances 
"Black Diamond" has appeared on the following Kiss albums:

Kiss - studio version
Alive! - live version
The Originals - studio version
Double Platinum - remixed & edited studio version
The Box Set - studio version
Kiss Symphony: Alive IV - live version
Gold - studio version
Kiss Alive! 1975–2000 - Alive! version + new live version
Sonic Boom - new studio version

Cover versions
The Replacements did a version on their 1984 album Let It Be. A live recording from 1986 was featured on the 2017 album For Sale: Live at Maxwell's 1986.
Yoshiki from the Japanese rock band X Japan created an arrangement of "Black Diamond" for a 72-piece orchestra on 1994's Kiss My Ass: Classic Kiss Regrooved tribute album.
Black Diamond Brigade, a Norwegian American super group featuring Billy Gould of Faith No More and members of Satyricon, Euroboys, Ralph Myerz and the Jack Herren Band, and Amulet formed as a one-off project just to cover this song in 2003.
Pearl Jam did a cover version of the song during their fan club member only show at the Vic Theatre in Chicago on August 2, 2007. Drummer Matt Cameron provided lead vocals. They also covered it on June 25, 2008 at Madison Square Garden in New York, NY with Cameron and guitarist Mike McCready on vocals and a special appearance by Frehley on guitar. They covered it a third time on June 26, 2018, in Rome, during their 2018 tour, with Cameron once again on vocals.

Credits and personnel
Peter Criss – lead vocals, drums
Paul Stanley – rhythm guitar, backing vocals, intro lead vocals
Ace Frehley – lead guitar, backing vocals
Gene Simmons – bass, backing vocals

Notes 
 Pearl Jam, retrieved (Feb. 16, 2008). Pearl Jam Set List, 8-2-2007 "Pearljam.com".

References

Blues rock songs
Kiss (band) songs
1974 songs
Songs written by Paul Stanley
The Replacements (band) songs